Carlos Manuel Febles (born May 24, 1976) is a Dominican professional baseball coach, and former second baseman who played in Major League Baseball (MLB) from 1998 to 2003 with the Kansas City Royals. He is currently the third base coach for the Boston Red Sox.

Playing career
After attending high school in the Dominican Republic, Febles was signed by the Kansas City Royals in 1993 as an amateur free agent. His first season in the Royals' farm system was 1995, when he played for the rookie league Gulf Coast League Royals. He played in Class A in 1996, Class A-Advanced in 1997, and Double-A in 1998. He was a late season call-up for the Royals in 1998, making his MLB debut on September 14 against the Oakland Athletics, recording a hit in his first MLB at bat. In 11 MLB games with the 1998 Royals, Febles batted 10-for-25 (.400).

Febles had a strong MLB rookie year in 1999, receiving early consideration as a potential Rookie of the Year candidate, and displaying strong defensive skills. Febles and fellow rookie Carlos Beltrán were nicknamed Dos Carlos (two Carlos) in Kansas City. Through mid-June, Febles was batting .286; his hitting then cooled off, and he finished the season with a .256 average, as Beltrán went on to win the American League Rookie of the Year award.

Febles batted a career-high .257 in 2000, then batted no higher than .245 the next three seasons. He was designated for assignment by the Royals in August 2003, and ended his playing career in 2004 with the Triple-A Pawtucket Red Sox, where he batted .257 in 68 games.

In 506 MLB games played, all with Kansas City, Febles batted .250 while collecting 414 hits, including 65 doubles, 18 triples and 24 home runs. He ranks third in career starts at second base for the Royals, with 454.

Coaching career

Febles has been a coach or manager in the Boston Red Sox' organization since 2007.  He began as a hitting coach with the Lowell Spinners in 2007, the Lancaster JetHawks in 2008, and the Salem Red Sox in 2009 and 2010.

He then was named the 2011 manager of the Spinners, the Red Sox' Short-Season A New York–Penn League farm club. After one season, Febles was promoted to manage the Greenville Drive, the Red Sox' affiliate in the Class A South Atlantic League and then rehired for 2013.

Another promotion followed when Febles was appointed manager of the 2014 Salem Red Sox, Boston's Class A Carolina League affiliate.  Febles led the Red Sox to a 68–68 record and a berth in the Carolina League playoffs, where they were defeated by the Myrtle Beach Pelicans, two games to one, in the opening round.  Febles was reappointed as Salem's pilot for 2015, and led them to a 66–73 mark. He then was promoted to manager of the Double-A Portland Sea Dogs for 2016. In 2017, Febles spent his second consecutive year as the Sea Dogs' skipper. Through 2017, his won-lost record as a manager was 400–504 (.442).

Febles was named third base coach for the major league Red Sox on November 2, 2017, and was in that role when the team won the 2018 World Series. He returned as Boston's third base coach for the 2019 season, but had to yield his coaching duties to assistant hitting coach Andy Barkett during June, due to pain in his right foot.

Personal life
Febles and his wife, Nedelin, have a son and a daughter. He resides in La Romana, Dominican Republic during the offseason.

References

External links

1976 births
Living people
Boston Red Sox coaches
Dominican Republic baseball coaches
Dominican Republic expatriate baseball players in the United States
Dominican Republic national baseball team people
Greenville Drive managers
Gulf Coast Royals players
Kansas City Royals players
Lansing Lugnuts players
Lowell Spinners managers
Major League Baseball players from the Dominican Republic
Major League Baseball second basemen
Major League Baseball third base coaches
Omaha Golden Spikes players
Omaha Royals players
Pawtucket Red Sox players
Portland Sea Dogs managers
Salem Red Sox managers
Wichita Wranglers players
Wilmington Blue Rocks players
People from El Seibo Province